Kobo, the Li'l Rascal, also known as , is a manga created by Masashi Ueda. Kodansha published three volumes of the manga as a bilingual Japanese-English editions, and Kodansha America distributed the book in the United States.

Kobo-chan began publication in the newspaper Yomiuri Shimbun on April 1, 1982. Beginning in December of that year, Soyosha published the series in book form. Nippon Television began airing the Kobo-chan strip on television on September 15, 1990. The weekly anime series ran on that channel from October 19, 1992, to March 21, 1994. Yomiuri had published 6,000 Kobo-chan strips by March 1999. Soyosha published Volume 60 on October 22, 2003. Houbunsha began publishing volumes on May 6, 2004. Its most recently volume, the 40th, was published on February 7, 2018.

The anime used to be available subtitled on Crunchyroll.

Characters
  - The namesake of the series.
  - Kobo's mother.
  - Kobo's father, Takeo's cousin-in-law, Iwao and Mine's son-in-law
 - Kobo's younger sister
  - Kobo's maternal grandfather, Takeo's maternal uncle, Koji's father-in-law, and Sanae's father
  - Kobo's maternal grandmother, Koji's mother-in-law, and Sanae's mother
  - Takeo is Iwao's nephew, Sanae's cousin, and Koji's cousin-in-law
  - Takeo's wife, Iwao's niece-in-law, and Sanae's cousin-in-law
  - family dog
  - family cat

International broadcast 
  RCTI (2001-2003), Spacetoon (2010-2018)
  Astro Ceria (2004-2005)
   (1998-2000)

References

External links
 
 

1982 manga
1992 anime television series debuts
1994 Japanese television series endings
Japanese children's animated comedy television series
Eiken (studio)
Houbunsha manga
Nippon TV original programming
Works originally published in Japanese newspapers